Eleutherodactylus teretistes is a species of frog in the family Eleutherodactylidae.
It is endemic to Mexico.
Its natural habitat is subtropical or tropical dry forests.
It is threatened by habitat loss.

References

teretistes
Amphibians described in 1958
Taxonomy articles created by Polbot